Islandborn is the first children's book by Dominican-American author and Pulitzer Prize-winner Junot Díaz. With illustrations by Leo Espinosa, who was born in Colombia, the picture-book features Dominican girls living in the Bronx, much like Díaz's goddaughters to whom he had long promised a children's book. The protagonist Lola, who immigrated when she was six years old, does not remember the Dominican Republic, and sets out to fill in her missing memories.

In The Chicago Tribune, Nara Schoenberg reviewed Islandborn as a "pitch-perfect children's book", noting Díaz's "humor, vivid detail and an authentic kid’s-eye view" as well as the "enticing mixed-media illustrations that bring Lola’s candy-colored world to life, infusing it with myth and magic."

The 48-page work was published by Dial Books for Young Readers on March 13, 2018.

References

2018 children's books
American picture books